Avril Moira Starling (born 19 April 1953) is an English former cricketer who played as a medium pace bowler. She appeared in 11 Test matches and 20 One Day Internationals for England between 1982 and 1986. She played domestic cricket for Lancashire and Cheshire and Middlesex.

References

External links
 

1953 births
Living people
England women One Day International cricketers
England women Test cricketers
Lancashire and Cheshire women cricketers
Middlesex women cricketers
People from Hampstead